Berendt Hus (also Huß or Huss;  1630February 1676) was a German organ builder.

Life and work 
Hus was born around 1630 in the Oldenburg area of northern Germany. The earliest record of his activity comes from 1650 when he assisted his master teacher Hermann Kröger in building a two-manual instrument in Langwarden. Shortly after the completion of the organ in Celle, where he worked in 1653 as a journeyman under Kröger on the organ's prospect, Hus became an independent organ builder. In 1654, Hus married Maria Fritzschen in Oldenburg and obtained citizenship rights in the city. Baptisms of four children were recorded between 1656 and 1671. His first independent project was a new organ built in Diepholz between 1655 and 1656.

Hus is best known as a relative and master teacher of the organ builder Arp Schnitger, who apprenticed with Hus between 1666 and 1671 and thereafter worked for him as a journeyman until Hus's death in 1676. Their most significant collaboration was a new organ in the Church of St. Cosmas and Damian in Stade built between 1668 and 1673.

The Kröger/Hus organ in Langwarden has been largely preserved in its original disposition (14 out of 21 stops).

All in all, Berendt Hus built five new organs and rebuilt or repaired several others.

Currently known works

References 

1676 deaths
German pipe organ builders